is a Japanese manga artist. In 2005, Wakui launched his first manga series, Shinjuku Swan, which performed well and received multiple adaptations. Following its success, Wakui launched Tokyo Revengers in 2017, which has also performed well.

Biography
After being fired from his first job, during his high school years, Wakui often spent time with street gangs. However, he later found work as a bar host and eventually graduated from high school. In 2004, Wakui entered Shinjuku Swan into the Weekly Young Magazine Newcomer Award, where it earned an honorable mention. The next year, it began serialization in Weekly Young Magazine, where it ran until 2013. The series performed well and earned a jury recommendation at the 12th Japan Media Arts Festival. It was also adapted into two live-action films, which were released in May 2015 and January 2017.

In March 2017, Wakui launched Tokyo Revengers in Weekly Shōnen Magazine. The series quickly became popular and won the Kodansha Manga Award in the shōnen category in 2020. It has also received multiple adaptations, notably an anime television series and a live-action film.

Works
  (2005–2013) (serialized in Weekly Young Magazine)
 Abaddon (2010–2012) (serialized in Weekly Young Magazine)
  (2014–2015) (serialized in Weekly Young Magazine)
  (2015–2016) (serialized in Weekly Shōnen Magazine)
  (2017–2022) (serialized in Weekly Shōnen Magazine)

References

External links
 

Living people
Manga artists
Winner of Kodansha Manga Award (Shōnen)
Year of birth missing (living people)